Rosy Ocampo (born on November 11, 1959 in México City, D.F., México) is a Mexican showrunner, television executive and producer. She was the VP of Content for Televisa (2017-2018), where she was undertaking the task of creating and executing strategies to help further develop and produce content for all the network’s free and pay-TV channels, targeting both Televisa and its sister network Univision.

Rosy Ocampo is a renowned Executive Producer and Showrunner with more than 30 years of experience in the television industry. The production team that he commands is recognized for its creative capacity, organization and high impact in the modernization of the telenovela, the main entertainment genre in the world and a fundamental axis in Televisa's offer. It is the most prolific producer in recent years, and the one that has produced the most original content.

In addition to her career as a producer, she held the position of Corporate Vice President of Content for Televisa, the largest multimedia company in the Spanish-speaking world.

Filmography

Awards and nominations

References

External links
 

1959 births
Living people
Mexican television directors
Mexican telenovela producers
People from Mexico City